Samba is a genre of Afro-Brazilian music and dance.

Samba may also refer to:

Dance

Samba (Brazilian dance), a genre of Afro-Brazilian dance
Samba (ballroom dance), a ballroom dance
Samba de Gafieira, a Brazilian ballroom dance

Music
Samba rock, a subgenre of samba
Samba!, a 1962 album by Edmundo Ros
Samba (album), a 2005 album by Twins
 "Samba" (song), a 2011 song by Ricky Martin from the album Música + Alma + Sexo

Places
Samba, Jammu and Kashmir, a town in Jammu and Kashmir, India
Samba district, a district in Jammu and Kashmir, India
Samba spy scandal, a spy scandal in Samba, Jammu, India in the 1970s
Samba, Iran, a village in South Khorasan Province, Iran
Samba, Luanda, a municipality in Luanda Province, Angola
Samba Department including the town Samba, Burkina Faso

People
Abderrahman Samba (born 1995), Qatari track athlete
Martin-Paul Samba (1875–1914), Cameroonian collaborator with and later rebel against German rule
Christopher Samba (born 1984), French football player
Cherno Samba (born 1985), Gambian-British football player
Brice Samba (born 1994), Congolese football player

Games and sport
Samba (shoe), a brand of indoor soccer shoe made by Adidas
Samba (card game), a variant of canasta
Salinas Valley Samba, a soccer team in the National Premier Soccer League

Films
Samba (1965 film), a Brazilian-Spanish musical film
Samba (1996 film), a Hungarian comedy film
Samba (2004 film), a Telugu-language Indian film
Samba (2014 film), a French comedy drama film

Brands, companies, technology and engineering
Samba (software), cross-platform network file and printer sharing suite
MacWWW, also known as Samba, an early Macintosh Web browser
Samba, a Cluster II satellite
Samba (bus), a name for one variation of the Volkswagen Type 2
Talbot Samba, a car produced by PSA Group 1981-1986
Cosmos Samba, ultralight trike aircraft
Samba TV, a smart TV company
Samba Financial Group, a banking firm in Saudi Arabia, formerly the Saudi American Bank

Other
Samba (Krishna's son), a son of the Hindu god Krishna
Samba (rice), a variety of rice grown in India and Sri Lanka

See also
 Sambar (disambiguation)
 
 
Kongo-language surnames

Surnames of Congolese origin